The 2018 Lehigh Mountain Hawks football team represents Lehigh University in the 2018 NCAA Division I FCS football season. The Mountain Hawks are led by 13th-year head coach Andy Coen and play their home games at Goodman Stadium. They are a member of the Patriot League. They finished the season 3–8, 2–4 in Patriot League play to finish in a three-way tie for fourth place.

Previous season
The Mountain Hawks finished the 2017 season 5–7, 5–1 in Patriot League play to finish in a tie for the Patriot League championship with Colgate. Due to their head-to-head win over Colgate, Lehigh received the Patriot League's automatic bid to the FCS Playoffs where they lost to Stony Brook in the first round.

Preseason

Award watch lists

Preseason coaches poll
The Patriot League released their preseason coaches poll on July 26, 2018, with the Mountain Hawks predicted to finish in second place.

Preseason All-Patriot League team
The Mountain Hawks placed three players on the preseason all-Patriot League team.

Offense

Brad Mayes – QB

Dom Bragalone – RB

Chris Fournier – OL

Schedule

Source: Schedule

Game summaries

Saint Francis (PA)

Villanova

at Navy

at Penn

at Princeton

Fordham

at Georgetown

at Holy Cross

Bucknell

Colgate

at Lafayette

References

Lehigh
Lehigh Mountain Hawks football seasons
Lehigh Mountain Hawks football